Låsby is a small town in the province of Jutland in Denmark with a population of 1,989 (1 January 2022). It is situated on the main road between Silkeborg and Aarhus.

The town is the location of the flagship property of  Det Blå Marked (trans. "The Blue Market"), a chain of Danish antique markets, and which is a major tourist attraction, bringing in over half a million visitors to the town every year.

In April 2005 it had its 15 minutes of fame as it became the first place in Denmark to experience the exploding toad phenomenon.

References

Laasby
Skanderborg Municipality